Souhail Hamouchane (born 26 November 1997) is a Moroccan swimmer. He competed in the men's 100 metre freestyle event at the 2017 World Aquatics Championships. In 2019, he represented Morocco at the 2019 African Games held in Rabat, Morocco.

References

External links
 

1997 births
Living people
Moroccan male swimmers
Swimmers at the 2018 Mediterranean Games
Place of birth missing (living people)
Swimmers at the 2019 African Games
African Games bronze medalists for Morocco
African Games medalists in swimming
Mediterranean Games competitors for Morocco
Moroccan male freestyle swimmers
21st-century Moroccan people